The 2021 Midwest Premier League season has been the first season of the Midwest Premier League.

The season have seen 20 founder teams divided in two divisions and the two toppers of each division have been crowned champions. 
Milwaukee Bavarian SC have won the West Division and Detroit City U23 topped the East Division.

Teams

Location map

Standings

East Division

West Division

See also
 NISA Nation
 National Independent Soccer Association
 Midwest Premier League
 2021 NISA Nation season

References

Midwest